Mesick House is a historic home constructed in 1875 in the Second Empire and Italianate Victorian architecture styles. It is one of two High Victorians remaining in Sacramento that display a mansard roof (the other being Stanford Mansion).

The home gets its name from its original owner, Mary Mesick.

It is located at 517 8th Street, Sacramento, California.

See also
Sacramento, California

References

Italianate architecture in California
Victorian architecture in California
Second Empire architecture in California
Houses on the National Register of Historic Places in California
Houses in Sacramento, California
National Register of Historic Places in Sacramento, California